Eugnophomyia is a genus of crane fly in the family Limoniidae.

Species
E. apache (Alexander, 1946)
E. azrael (Alexander, 1943)
E. chirindensis (Alexander, 1930)
E. curraniana (Alexander, 1945)
E. darlingtoni (Alexander, 1937)
E. elegans (Wiedemann, 1830)
E. excordis (Alexander, 1951)
E. flagrans (Alexander, 1929)
E. flammeithorax (Alexander, 1949)
E. funebris (Alexander, 1922)
E. funerea (Alexander, 1938)
E. fuscocostata (Alexander, 1959)
E. glabripennis (Alexander, 1948)
E. golbachi (Alexander, 1962)
E. incurvata Alexander, 1971
E. juniniana (Alexander, 1951)
E. leucoplaca (Alexander, 1921)
E. luctuosa (Osten Sacken, 1860)
E. melancholica (Alexander, 1922)
E. pammelas (Alexander, 1922)
E. peramoena (Alexander, 1920)
E. perelegans (Alexander, 1920)
E. perlaeta (Alexander, 1958)
E. posticata (Alexander, 1939)
E. preclara (Alexander, 1960)
E. silindicola (Alexander, 1948)
E. stuckenbergiana Alexander, 1976
E. tempestiva (Alexander, 1943)
E. turneri (Alexander, 1930)
E. vivasberthieri (Alexander, 1944)

References

Limoniidae
Nematocera genera